C. guatemalensis may refer to:
 Clidemia guatemalensis, a plant species in the genus Clidemia
 Cobana guatemalensis, a plant species found in Honduras and Guatemala
 Croton guatemalensis, the copalchi, a plant species
 Cupania guatemalensis, a plant species in the genus Cupania

See also
 Guatemalensis